Swann is a 1996 Canadian drama film directed by Anna Benson Gyles, written by David Young, and starring Brenda Fricker as Rose Hindmarch, a small town librarian whose life is significantly changed when Sarah Maloney (Miranda Richardson), a famous author and academic, arrives in town to research a new book about the long-ago murder of local poet Mary Swann. The film's cast also includes Miranda Richardson, Michael Ontkean, David Cubitt, Sean McCann and John Neville. The film was an adaptation of the Carol Shields novel Swann: A Mystery, which was itself inspired by the real-life murder of poet Pat Lowther.

The film premiered as the opening gala at the 1996 Toronto International Film Festival.

Award nominations
The film garnered five Genie Award nominations at the 17th Genie Awards in 1996:
Best Actress: Brenda Fricker
Best Supporting Actor: Sean McCann
Best Art Direction/Production Design: John Dondertman 
Best Costume Design: Elisbetta Beraldo
Best Original Score: Richard Rodney Bennett 
It did not win any of the awards.

References

External links
 

1996 films
1996 drama films
Canadian drama films
English-language Canadian films
Films based on Canadian novels
Films scored by Richard Rodney Bennett
1990s English-language films
1990s Canadian films